Skinner Reserve is an Australian rules football stadium located on Churchill Avenue, Braybrook, Victoria. It is most notable as the former home ground of the Sunshine Football Club in the Victorian Football Association (VFA).

Prior to Skinner Reserve being developed as a football ground, the primary sports venue in the City of Sunshine was Selwyn Park, Albion. In 1964, the Sunshine Council agreed to lease Selwyn Park to the George Cross soccer club, which was playing in Victoria's top level soccer league at the time; but, the Sunshine Football Club, as well as the local baseball and sub-district cricket clubs, still had three years to run on their lease. To secure agreement from the Sunshine Football Club to end the lease, the Sunshine Council committed to developing a new VFA-standard venue at Skinner Reserve. The venue was built during the 1965 season, with the football club signing a seven-year lease to begin from 1966. The venue had a very wide playing surface, high grassed embankments for spectators, and a grandstand – narrow, but quite tall by suburban standards – named the J. A. Chigwidden Stand after long-serving Sunshine Football Club committeeman Jack Chigwidden.

During 1965, before the venue was finished, the Victorian Football League's Footscray Football Club made an application to the Sunshine Council to permanently move its playing and administrative base to the venue, and to develop it further to a VFL-standard venue; this came at a time when fellow VFL clubs  and  had just moved their bases to VFA venues (Moorabbin Oval and Coburg City Oval respectively). The council ultimately honoured its existing agreement with the Sunshine Football Club, and rejected Footscray's application, and Sunshine began playing at the venue in 1966.

Sunshine used the ground from 1966 until it folded in 1989. The venue also hosted several VFA seconds/reserves finals matches, including Grand Finals. Additionally, through much of its history it was not used for cricket, which made it an attractive venue for VFL clubs to play pre-season practice matches while the cricket season was still going. Floodlights were installed in 1987 to enable games to be played at night, although the only such VFA premiership match ever to be scheduled was cancelled due to the forfeiture of Sunshine's opponent, Caulfield, for unrelated reasons. A large crowd of 8,000 saw a fundraising match between former  and  players on the ground in October 1989, as part of efforts by Footscray supporters to save their club from merging with Fitzroy.

The ground is today used primarily for local football, soccer and cricket. The Chigwidden Stand, having reached the end of its life and utility, was demolished in late 2015; its function as a pavilion, but not as a grandstand, was taken over by the Braybrook Community Hub, located in the wider Skinner Reserve area.

References

Australian rules football grounds
Sports venues in Melbourne
Sport in the City of Maribyrnong
Buildings and structures in the City of Maribyrnong